State Route 134 (SR 134) is a north–south state highway in the southwestern portion of the U.S. state of Ohio.  Its southern terminus is at its intersection with SR 32 in Sardinia and its northern terminus is at its intersection with Main Street in Port William.

History
SR 134 was commissioned in 1923, on the same route as today between Sardinia and Wilmington. In 1926 the route was paved between Pulse and Lynchburg. The section of road between SR 28 and Wilmington was paved in 1934. The rest of the original highway was paved in 1935. In 1938 the highway was extended to Port William. One year later the route between Wilmington and Port William was paved.

Major intersections

References

134
Transportation in Brown County, Ohio
Transportation in Highland County, Ohio
Transportation in Clinton County, Ohio